is a Japanese singer, dancer, model and actress. She is a member of J-Pop group Happiness, and a former member E-girls, and ShuuKaRen, and an exclusive model for the magazines JJ and Nicola.

Karen is represented by LDH.

Early life
Karen entered the entertainment industry at a very young age after she was scouted in her hometown, Osaka. While belonging to the office in which she got scouted, she participated in one of Exile's dance competitions and began attending LDH's talent academy EXPG (Exile Professional Gym), studying both dancing and singing. Her sister Shuuka also attended EXPG. As a junior high school student, she moved from Osaka to Tokyo and started to live in a dormitory.

Career 
On October 26 in 2008, Karen became one of the EXPG graduates who were chosen to be members of the performance group Happiness, marking the start in her career as a vocalist and performer. Her official stage name became Karen (stylized as KAREN).

In February 2009 she started her modeling career by becoming an exclusive model for the fashion magazine Nicola.

On February 9, 2011, she made her major debut with Happiness with their single "Kiss Me". On April 24 in the same year, she was announced as member of E-girls (alongside all other members of Happiness), having a concurrent position in E-girls and Happiness.

Karen graduated as an exclusive model for Nicola in May 2013. In June she changed her stage name and started using her birth name. On July 22, it was announced that Karen would start working as an exclusive model for JJ, also a fashion magazine, from its September issue onward.

In January 2014 she made her debut as actress on the Nippon TV drama A Perfect Day for Love Letters (Koibumi Biyori).

On August 11, 2016, she was announced to debut in the unit ShuuKaRen alongside Shuuka Fujii. The duo debuted on October 5.

In February 2017, she was the cover of the April issue of JJ, being her first magazine cover since her debut as a model. On December 31 in the same year, Shuuka graduated from Flower and ShuuKaRen and retired from entertainment industry. With Karen being the only remaining member of the duo, ShuuKaRen disbanded.

In November 2018, Karen was chosen as one of the ambassadors for LDH Martial Arts' "ENERGY PROJECT" which advertises different fitness supplies from LDH's original brand.

On July 16, 2019, she released her first photobook titled KAREN. In August of the same year, Karen collaborated as a creative director with fashion label Samantha Thavasa for a collection of designer bags, titled Samantha Vega Girl. In the same year, she also starred in a special collaboration movie of Saint Laurent and i-D Japan alongside Sho Kiyohara.

Personal life 
Karen is the younger sister of Johnny's West member Ryusei Fujii and former E-girls, Flower and ShuuKaRen member Shuuka Fujii.

Filmography
To see her appearances with Happiness, see Happiness (Japanese group), to see her appearances with E-girls, see E-girls.

Runways

TV Dramas

Films

Internet TV

TV Shows

Commercials

Music videos

Voice acting

Bibliography

Style books/Photo books

Magazines

Catalogues

References

External links

 
 
 
 

1996 births
Actresses from Osaka Prefecture
Japanese female dancers
Japanese female models
LDH (company) artists
Living people
Models from Osaka Prefecture
Musicians from Osaka Prefecture
People from Osaka Prefecture
21st-century Japanese singers
21st-century Japanese women singers